David Bumberger (born 5 February 1999) is an Austrian professional footballer who plays as a centre-back for Vorwärts Steyr.

Career
Bumberger is a product of the youth academies of DSG Union Putzleinsdorf, LASK, Red Bull Salzburg and AKA Linz. He began his senior career with Juniors OÖ. He made his professional debut with Juniors OÖ in a 2–2 2. Liga tie with Floridsdorfer on 12 August 2018. He extended his contract with their then senior team, LASK, on 5 May 2020. On 5 October 2020, he transferred to Rheindorf Altach in the Austrian Football Bundesliga.

On 5 January 2023, Bumberger signed a 1.5-year contract with Vorwärts Steyr after playing for the club on loan earlier in the season.

International career
Bumberger is a youth international for Austria, having played for the Austria U18s and U19s.

References

External links
 
 OEFB Profile
 Bundesliga.at Profile

1999 births
Living people
People from Rohrbach District
Austrian footballers
Austria youth international footballers
SC Rheindorf Altach players
FC Juniors OÖ players
SK Vorwärts Steyr players
Austrian Football Bundesliga players
2. Liga (Austria) players
Austrian Regionalliga players
Association football defenders